Dingshui is a town in Yanggu County, Liaocheng, in western Shandong, China.

References

Township-level divisions of Shandong